Hazebrouck is a commune in the Nord department, Hauts-de-France. It was a small market town in Flanders until it became an important railway junction in the 1860s. West Flemish was the usual language until 1880, when French was taught at school by mandate of the French government in an effort to "Frenchify" the people of the Nord-Pas-de-Calais and to extinguish their Flemish roots. The development of the railways linked Hazebrouck to Lille to Calais and Dunkirk.

History
The incorporation into France of what had previously been a Flemish town was ratified in the 1678 Treaties of Nijmegen.

Hazebrouck's town hall was built in the 19th century and the oldest monument of the town is St Eloi's church. During the two world wars Hazebrouck was an important military target. Many British soldiers are buried in the cemeteries around the town. In the town museum, which was originally a chapel and friary of the Augustines, visitors can see the Hazebrouck's giants: Roland, Tijse-Tajse, Toria and Babe-Tajse; a collection of Flemish and French paintings and a traditional Flemish kitchen.

World War I: Fourth Battle of Ypres and Hazebrouck

An attack by the German army was proposed in October 1917 by the Army Group Commander Field Marshal Prince Rupprecht of Bavaria as a large-scale attack either carried by itself or as an attack to relieve pressure on the German Front. Rupprecht's Army Group held the German Front in Flanders and Picardy; his command covered the Belgian coast to Ypres and on to Armentières.

The operation was given the codename of "George" and plans were submitted for an offensive attack between Ypres and Bethune. The breakthrough would be made in the British Front just south of the Belgian-French border  in the Lys river area with the intention to get past the Allied Front there and advance to Hazebrouck. This would divide and cut the British Second Army near the Lys river away from the British Army in Artois. The British-held rail centre of Hazebrouck would be captured and the British troops in Belgian Flanders could be forced westwards and stuck on the Belgian coast. The operation would, however, only be possible to start from April.

Heraldry

Population

Politics

Presidential Elections 2nd Round

Town twinning

Hazebrouck is twinned with the market town of Faversham in Kent, United Kingdom.

College Saint-Jacques private chapel

A private chapel which is now part of College Saint-Jacques can now be visited. This old College was an  English hospital during the First World War.

Transportation
The town has a railway station, with frequent daily services to Lille and Paris, some via the LGV Nord. There is also a small international airport, concentrating on business flights, at Merville-Calonne just 12 kilometre / 8 miles away. The town is connected to the national Autoroute network, which links Hazebrouck with Dunkirk and Lille and, less directly, Arras, Paris, Calais and Brussels.

See also
Communes of the Nord department
French Flanders

References

External links

 Official town website (in French)
  History of St Francis of Assisi college 1854-1973 (in English)
 How to pronounce Hazebrouck (in French)

Communes of Nord (French department)
French Flanders